A printer's hat (also called a pressman's or carpenter's hat) is a traditional, box-shaped, folded paper hat, formerly worn by craft tradesmen such as carpenters, masons, painters and printers. For printers, the cap served to keep ink from matting their hair.

The folding process starts with a simple bicorne hat, then folds the two corners inward and the peak down to create a compact and stable box.

External links
Instructions for folding different versions of this hat can be found at:
   How to Make a Printer’s Hat
  YouTube video

Hats